Chance Morgan Coasters, Inc. is a roller coaster and amusement ride manufacturer. It was formed on June 14, 2001 when Michael Chance, grandson of Chance Rides founder Richard H. Chance, acquired the assets of roller coaster builder D. H. Morgan Manufacturing of La Selva Beach, California. At the time, Chance Rides was going through bankruptcy reorganization and neither Chance Industries nor Chance Rides had any equity in the company. Michael Chance was the main investor along with a few silent partners. The company operated separately for a few years under the Chance Morgan name and handled the sales for Chance Rides Manufacturing.

Chance Rides

In 2011, Chance Morgan reintroduced the Chance Rides brand name in its marketing efforts, in celebration of the 50th anniversary of the founding of Chance Manufacturing Co., Inc. in 1961 by Harold Chance.

Roller coasters
Superman el Último Escape at Six Flags México
Steel Lasso at Frontier City

Notes

Ferris wheels
Notable examples include:
Niagara SkyWheel (2006)
Myrtle Beach SkyWheel (2011)

See also
:Category:Amusement rides manufactured by Chance Morgan
:Category:Roller coasters manufactured by Chance Morgan

References

Amusement ride manufacturers
Roller coaster manufacturers
Companies based in Wichita, Kansas